Faro Annie is the 1971 solo album by British folk musician John Renbourn. On this release, Renbourn ventures into folk rock and blues territory. There is also heavy use of the sitar on this album, played by Renbourn himself. He is joined on the album by Pentangle bandmates Danny Thompson and Terry Cox.

Track listing

Personnel
John Renbourn - guitar, sitar, harmonica, lead vocals
Danny Thompson - bass on "Shake Shake Mamma" and "Faro Annie"
Sue Draheim - fiddle on "Little Sadie", "Willy O'Winsbury" and "Country Blues"
Pete Dyer - harmonica on "Kokomo Blues" and "Come On in My Kitchen"
Terry Cox - drums on "Shake Shake Mamma" and "Faro Annie"
Dorris Henderson - vocals on "White House Blues", "Kokomo Blues" and "Back on the Road Again"

Production
Producer: Bill Leader
Recording Engineer: Nic Kinsey
Art Direction: John Ashcroft
Photography: Shepard Sherbell, Janet Kerr
Liner notes: Colin Harper

References

1971 albums
John Renbourn albums
Reprise Records albums
Transatlantic Records albums
Albums produced by Bill Leader